SubTropolis is a ,  artificial cave in the bluffs above the Missouri River in Kansas City, Missouri, United States, that is claimed to be the world's largest underground storage facility. Developed by late Kansas City Chiefs owner Lamar Hunt via Hunt Midwest Real Estate Development, Inc., it has trademarked the phrase World's Largest Underground Business Complex.

Dug into the Bethany Falls limestone mine, SubTropolis is, in places,  beneath the surface. The complex contains almost  of illuminated, paved roads and several miles of railroad track.

The mine naturally maintains temperatures between  year-round. The United States Postal Service and the United States Environmental Protection Agency lease spaces within SubTropolis, the United States Postal Service for its collectible stamp operations and the U.S. Environmental Protection Agency for their Region-7 Training and Logistics Center. The National Archives and Records Administration also leases space for a Federal Records Center. 

On the north edge of the complex Hunt developed the Worlds of Fun and Oceans of Fun amusement park complex. Hunt's extensive business dealings in Clay County contributed to the Chiefs having their NFL Training Camp at William Jewell College in Liberty, Missouri until 1991.

Other facilities like SubTropolis exist although not on the same scale, such as the abandoned mine in Butler, Pennsylvania used by Corbis and the US Federal Government for secure storage.  As the room and pillar mining method is used to extract limestone throughout the Midwest, many companies are looking at ways to utilize the hundreds of millions of square feet created in this manner for everything from mushroom farming to crude oil stockpiling.

See also
 Mega Cavern, a similar (although smaller) cavern in Louisville, Kentucky

References
Kansas City Star profile
NBC Today Show segment
CNN Great Big Story segment
CNN/Money story

External links
 SubTropolis home site (Hunt Midwest)
 Hunt Midwest home site (Hunt Midwest)
 SubTropolis Technology Center home site (Hunt Midwest)
 Hunt Midwest - YouTube

Buildings and structures in Kansas City, Missouri
Landforms of Clay County, Missouri
Economy of Kansas City, Missouri
Subterranea of the United States
Warehouses in the United States
Buildings and structures in Missouri
Limestone industry